Palaeohyphantes is a monotypic genus of Australian dwarf spiders containing the single species, Palaeohyphantes simplicipalpis. It was first described by Alfred Frank Millidge in 1984, and has only been found in Australia.

See also
 List of Linyphiidae species (I–P)

References

Linyphiidae
Monotypic Araneomorphae genera
Spiders of Australia